Eddy is an unincorporated community in LaGrange County, Indiana, in the United States.

A post office was established at Eddy in 1893, and remained in operation until it was discontinued in 1904.

References

Unincorporated communities in LaGrange County, Indiana
Unincorporated communities in Indiana